Bijai Garh, also known as Vijayamandirgarh or Bijaigarh, is a fort located in Bayana in Bharatpur district. It is approximately 25km from the nearest city, Hindaun. The fort was built by King Vijayapala in 1040 CE. 

Bijaigarh contains several old temples and red stones pillars bearing an Inscription of Vishnuvardhan Feudatory of Samudragupta. The fort was described as one of the most famous forts in India by Babur.

References

Forts in Rajasthan
Tourist attractions in Bharatpur district
Tourist attractions near Hindaun